The Löster or Lösterbach is a right tributary of the Prims in Rhineland-Palatinate and Saarland.

Route 
It rises to about 525 meters above sea level at Reinsfeld as Dörrenbach, is joined by the Rotbach near Hermeskeil and is then called Löster. It flows through the mills at the Steiner forest and crosses under the Federal Highway 1 (European route E422), flows through Bierfeld and Löstertal and flows at about 265 meters above sea level south of the Saarland town Wadern near the Dagstuhl Castle into the Prims, shortly before the mouth of the Wadrill in the Prims. The Hochwald train runs from Hermeskeil through the valley and crosses it in the area where the Felsbach (border between Rhineland-Palatinate and Saarland) opens into the Löster.

Incoming rivers 
Right tributaries are the Bach from Lascheiderhof who Detzbach who Bleidenbach and Lohbach. Left tributaries are the Senkelbach, the Hahn Born Bach, the Bach at Erzberg, the Rotbach by Bach from Rückersbergerhof who Felsbach who Wäschbach and Nonnweiler Bach. [2]

References 
 Topographic Map 1: 25.000
 GeoExplorer Rhineland-Palatinate

Rivers of Saarland
Rivers of the Hunsrück
Rivers of Germany